Patrick Graham may refer to:

 Patrick Graham (bishop) (died 1478), Bishop of Brechin and Bishop of St Andrews, first Archbishop of St. Andrews
 Patrick Graham (VC) (1837–1875), Irish recipient of the Victoria Cross
 Patrick Graham (boxer) (born 1969), Canadian heavyweight boxer
Patrick Graham (judge) (1906–1993), English judge
 Pat Graham (photographer), American photographer
 Patrick Graham (American football) (born 1979), American football coach
 Pat Graham (ice hockey) (born 1961), Canadian ice hockey player
 Patrick Graham (Royal Navy officer) (1915–1980), British naval officer

See also
 Patrick de Graham, 13th-century Scottish noble